Amphisbaena mongoyo is a worm lizard species in the family Amphisbaenidae. It is endemic to Brazil.

References

mongoyo
Reptiles described in 2019
Endemic fauna of Brazil
Reptiles of Brazil
Taxa named by Mauro Teixeira Jr.
Taxa named by Francisco Dal Vechio
Taxa named by Renato Recoder
Taxa named by José Cassimiro
Taxa named by Marco Aurélio de Sena
Taxa named by Miguel Trefaut Rodrigues